Godfrey Martin Huggins, 1st Viscount Malvern  (6 July 1883 – 8 May 1971), was a Rhodesian politician and physician. He served as the fourth Prime Minister of Southern Rhodesia from 1933 to 1953 and remained in office as the first Prime Minister of the Federation of Rhodesia and Nyasaland until October 1956, becoming the longest serving prime minister in British Commonwealth history.

Early life and education
Huggins was born at 'Dane Cottage', Knoll Road, Bexley in northern Kent, England (now a borough of London), the second child, but eldest son of a stockbroker. The family later moved to a property his father built, 'Shore House' in Sevenoaks, a town 27 miles from London. He was educated at Brunswick House, a preparatory school in Hove and then moved to Sutherland House, a similar school in Folkestone.

He suffered a severe infection of the left middle ear at the age of 11, which left him deaf on that side and delayed his move to Malvern College in 1898, a school from which he later took part of his title. From there he moved on to study medicine at St. Thomas's Hospital, London, after some difficulty obtaining the necessary entrance qualifications.

After practising medicine and training as a surgeon in London, spending some time as a Resident Superintendent at Great Ormond Street Hospital, Huggins travelled to Salisbury, Southern Rhodesia, in 1911, initially to act as a locum to some doctors there, but eventually deciding to stay on.

First World War
Huggins returned to the UK in late 1914 following the outbreak of war and joined the Royal Army Medical Corps with the rank of lieutenant from October 1914. Huggins was first stationed at Colchester Hospital in Essex, which had become a casualty clearing station. Although he wanted to go to France, he was sent to Malta where he dealt with incoming casualties from the Battle of Gallipoli.

Promoted to the rank of captain in March 1916, Doctors only had to serve for a year at that point in the war, and so in 1916 Huggins went out again to Southern Rhodesia but returned to the UK within a few months. This time he was posted to the Hammersmith Orthopaedic Hospital and then the Pavilion Hospital in Brighton. In 1917, he finally got to go to France with the 5th Cavalry Field Ambulance, attached to the 2nd Cavalry Division near Amiens. His surgical work at this time led to his writing a book, Amputation Stumps: Their Care and After Treatment (Frowde, Hodder & Stoughton, London 1918).

Practice in Southern Rhodesia
He returned to Southern Rhodesia at the end of the war, just in time to deal with the 1918 influenza epidemic, and bought Craig Farm on the outskirts of Salisbury, now Harare, which was to remain his home for the rest of his life. He began again as a surgeon, quickly becoming the best known, albeit in a small field, in Southern Rhodesia. He married in 1921 to Blanche Slatter of Pietermaritzburg, the daughter (some sources say stepdaughter) of a Major in the South African Constabulary. He and his wife had two sons, born in 1922 and 1928.

Having become a spokesman for the local Comrades of the Great War Association, he began to have contact with government, intervening for the Association with the then-Administrator, Sir Drummond Chaplin. Although he was on the side of union with South Africa when there was a referendum on the matter in 1922, he accepted the Southern Rhodesian decision to 'go it alone' and accept responsible government.

Political career
He entered politics in 1924 as a Rhodesia Party member and was elected, unopposed, in the Salisbury North constituency, to the Southern Rhodesian Legislative Assembly of the newly created self-governing colony. In 1932, he broke with the Rhodesia Party government led by Howard Unwin Moffat when it introduced a measure to cut civil service salaries by 10%; a cut that was especially unpopular in Huggins's constituency which had a large number of civil servants. Huggins could not vote against the government without precipitating an early general election, something he did not wish to do as an election was already scheduled for the next year. Instead, Huggins voted for the bill and then crossed the floor the next day to join the newly formed Reform Party which appointed Huggins Leader of the Opposition.

Prime Minister

Huggins became Prime Minister of Southern Rhodesia following the 1933 general election which his Reform Party won by a one-seat majority with 16 out of 30 seats in the Legislative Assembly. The Reform Party's platform included measures such as the creation of a central bank and various economic, credit and monetary reforms designed to provide support for the white working class during the Great Depression. The Reform Party was believed by many in Rhodesia to be a left-wing party but Huggins presented a cautiously conservative Cabinet after winning power in 1933. In particular, Finance Minister Jacob Smit was a strong believer in conventional economics and opponent of Keynesianism. The course of government led eventually to a confrontation in August 1934 with the left-wing of the party over reform to the Rhodesian Railways. Huggins decided to approach Sir Percy Fynn, leader of the Rhodesia Party, who pledged support for a National Government under Huggins.

However, the acting Governor refused a dissolution on the grounds that the Assembly had many years left, and the government had not been defeated. Huggins persuaded the majority of the Executive of the Reform Party to suspend the party's constitution to allow a National Government on 17 September, and then formed the United Party with Fynn, asking a second time for a dissolution on the basis of a changed party alignment. This time the Acting Governor acceded.

The November 1934 election resulted in a landslide for Huggins' United Party, which won 24 out of 30 seats, while the Reform Party returned only one seat in the new legislature. Huggins himself switched electoral districts and ran and defeated Reform Party MP Thomas Nangle who had been one of the Reform Party's founders. In addition to prime ministership, Huggins was the Minister of Finance on several occasions.

Huggins was made a Knight Commander of the Order of St Michael and St George (KCMG) in the 1941 New Year Honours, and appointed to the Privy Council of the United Kingdom, granting the title "The Right Honourable", in the 1947 Birthday Honours. He was a guest at the 1947 wedding of Princess Elizabeth and Philip, Duke of Edinburgh.

Federation of Rhodesia and Nyasaland

Huggins became an advocate of federating Southern Rhodesia with some of the neighbouring British colonies in the region so that they would become an independent state within the British Empire while maintaining white minority rule with only a small number of educated Blacks having the vote in addition to white settlers. As a result of his efforts, the Federation of Rhodesia and Nyasaland was created in 1953 uniting Northern Rhodesia, Southern Rhodesia and Nyasaland, with Huggins as the federation's first Prime Minister after his new United Federal Party won the federation's first general election. Huggins remained in office until October 1956 and was elevated to the Peerage of the United Kingdom as Viscount Malvern in March 1955, over a year and a half before his retirement. He was succeeded as federal Prime Minister by Sir Roy Welensky. The biggest political issue of his tenure as federal Prime Minister was the question of race relations. Huggins and other proponents of Federation claimed to stand for a policy of partnership, which was claimed to be much more enlightened than the apartheid that the new Nationalist Party government was then installing in South Africa. He compared it to "the partnership of rider and horse." The following quotation, from a speech he made to the Federal Assembly on 28 July 1954, against a motion to enforce equal treatment of the races, illustrates Huggins's attitude towards black Africans:

You cannot expect Europeans to form in a queue with dirty people, possibly an old mfazi with an infant on her back, mewling and puking and making a mess of everything... It is perfectly obvious to anyone that the system we have in Southern Rhodesia at the present time is the most satisfactory to both sides and it is certainly impossible to alter it until the hon. leaders of the African people have cleaned up their brother Africans a bit; and then we can perhaps consider it.

Having served 23 years as Prime Minister, Lord Malvern, as he now was, became the longest serving Prime Minister in British Commonwealth history, beating the records of Mackenzie King of Canada and Sir Robert Walpole of Great Britain and Ireland. He is the only Prime Minister in British Commonwealth history to serve under four monarchs (George V, Edward VIII, George VI, and Elizabeth II). Lord Malvern's successor, Welensky, spent his time in office trying to prevent an inevitable break-up of the Federation.

Lord Malvern lived out the remainder of his life in Southern Rhodesia, continuing his quiet retirement under the territory's Unilateral Declaration of Independence (UDI) administration. He died in May 1971 aged 87.

Honours

Medals and awards

Honorific eponyms
 Godfrey Huggins School of Medicine, University of Rhodesia
 Godfrey Huggins Primary School, Marondera
 Lord Malvern High School, Salisbury
 Malvern House, Peterhouse Boys' School

Grant of Arms

References

Bibliography

External links

Collection of the National Portrait Gallery : Godfrey Martin Huggins, 1st Viscount Malvern of Rhodesia and Bexley  (1883–1971), Prime Minister of Southern Rhodesia.
Godfrey Martin Huggins, Viscount Malvern, 1883–1971: his life and work. Edited by Michael Gelfand and Joseph Ritchken. Central African Journal of Medicine in Salisbury, Rhodesia, 1971.
 Lord Malvern, Chairman of the Council of University College, Rhodesia, receiving the Queen Mother.  British Pathé. 1960.
Rhodesian Prime Minister Godfrey Huggins ALS. www.worthpoint.com. Retrieved 15 May 2010.
Statesman and Surgeon. British Medical Journal, 20 November 1971, pp.  497.
MAKER OF MODERN RHODESIA THE RT. HON. SIR GODFREY HUGGINS Written in 1951 by Cyril Allen, O.B.E., J.P
 

Prime Ministers of Rhodesia
Finance ministers of Rhodesia
Foreign ministers of Rhodesia
Rhodesian military medical officers
1883 births
1971 deaths
British emigrants to Rhodesia
British Army personnel of World War I
Rhodesian military personnel of World War I
Federation of Rhodesia and Nyasaland people
Members of the Legislative Assembly of Southern Rhodesia
Members of the Rhodesia and Nyasaland Federal Assembly
Fellows of the Royal College of Surgeons
Northern Rhodesia people
Royal Army Medical Corps officers
Knights Commander of the Order of St Michael and St George
Knights of the Order of St John
Members of the Order of the Companions of Honour
Members of the Privy Council of the United Kingdom
People educated at Malvern College
People from Bexley
White Rhodesian people
World War II political leaders
20th-century Zambian people
Zimbabwean surgeons
United Federal Party politicians
Viscounts created by Elizabeth II
Defence Ministers of Zimbabwe
Viscounts in the Peerage of the United Kingdom